Thomas Broughan (born 1 August 1947) is a former Irish Independent politician who served as a Teachta Dála (TD) from 1992 to 2020.

He sat as a TD for the Labour Party until late 2011, representing the Dublin North-East constituency from 1992 until constituency changes for the 2016 general election.

Early life
Broughan was born in Dublin in 1947. He was educated at Moyle Park College, Clondalkin, University College Dublin and University of London. He worked as a teacher at St. Aidan's CBS, Whitehall, before entering politics in 1991, when he was elected to Dublin City Council.

Labour Party
The following year, Broughan was first elected to Dáil Éireann at the 1992 general election to the 27th Dáil as a Labour Party TD for Dublin North-East. He retained his seat at the 1997, 2002, 2007, 2011 and 2016 general elections.

Broughan previously served as Labour Party Spokesperson for Enterprise, Trade and Employment; Communications, Energy and Natural Resources; and Transport.

Broughan was regarded as being on the left-wing of the Labour Party. He first lost the party whip in 1994, during the Fianna Fáil-Labour Party coalition when he disagreed with the government decision to sell Team Aer Lingus, but he returned when that coalition collapsed at the end of 1994.

During Pat Rabbitte's leadership of the Labour party from 2002 to 2007, Broughan was a leading critic of Rabbitte's decision to form an electoral alliance with Fine Gael, instead advocating an independent strategy for the party, in addition to closer co-operation with the Green Party and Sinn Féin.

He had the Labour parliamentary party whip withdrawn on 29 June 2010, for failing to attend a vote on the Wildlife (Amendment) Bill 2010 in the Dáil. He along with fellow TD Joanna Tuffy both opposed the Labour Party going into coalition with Fine Gael in the aftermath of the 2011 general election.

During the 31st Dáil, he became increasingly critical of a number of government policies. In November 2011, he criticised Transport Minister Leo Varadkar's decision to defer the Dublin Metro, claiming it would have been a "huge boost" to economic growth and employment in the Dublin/Mid-Leinster region. He lost the parliamentary Labour Party whip after voting to reject a government amendment to extend the bank guarantee for another year on 1 December 2011. This was his third time to lose the Labour whip, having previously done so in 1994 and 2010. He stated he could not support adding more debt and called on Labour party TDs to join him on the opposition benches to oppose elements of the Government's economic policy.

Social Democratic Union

In April 2014, it was reported that Broughan had left the Labour Party, was forming a "Social Democratic Union" for his constituency supporters, and hoped like-minded Independent TDs would join.

The group is unconnected to the Social Democrats, formed by Broughan's former Labour Party colleague Róisín Shortall along with two other Independent TDs. Broughan has ruled himself out of joining the new party stating he planned to remain an Independent deputy. As of July 2015, the Social Democratic Union remains unregistered.

2016 general election
At the 2016 general election, he stood as an Independents 4 Change candidate in the Dublin Bay North constituency. He was re-elected to the Dáil. He voted for Richard Boyd Barrett for Taoiseach when the 32nd Dáil first met.

Broughan left the party on 26 July 2016.

On 22 January 2020, he announced that he would not be contesting the 2020 general election.

References

External links

 

1947 births
Living people
Alumni of University College Dublin
Alumni of the University of London
Independent TDs
Irish schoolteachers
Labour Party (Ireland) TDs
Local councillors in Dublin (city)
Members of the 27th Dáil
Members of the 28th Dáil
Members of the 29th Dáil
Members of the 30th Dáil
Members of the 31st Dáil
Members of the 32nd Dáil
Politicians from County Dublin
Independents 4 Change TDs